Olena Mykolayivna Dmytrash (born ) is a Ukrainian group rhythmic gymnast. She is the 2013 World bronze medalist in 10 clubs and 2015 Universiade champion in 6 clubs + 2 hoops.

Career 
Dmytrash represents her nation at international competitions. She participated at the 2008 Summer Olympics, 2012 Summer Olympics and 2016 Summer Olympics. She is the Ukrainian rhythmic gymnast with most appearances at the Olympic stage as well one of the few rhythmic gymnasts of the world that has attended and reached the Olympic finals.  She also competed at world championships, including at the 2007, 2009, 2010, 2011, 2013, 2014 and 2015 World Championships.

At the 2015 European Games in Baku, Dmytrash won a silver medal in the group ribbons event and a bronze medal in the group clubs and hoops event.

References

External links 
 
 

1991 births
Living people
Ukrainian rhythmic gymnasts
Place of birth missing (living people)
Gymnasts at the 2008 Summer Olympics
Gymnasts at the 2012 Summer Olympics
Olympic gymnasts of Ukraine
Gymnasts at the 2015 European Games
European Games medalists in gymnastics
European Games silver medalists for Ukraine
European Games bronze medalists for Ukraine
People from Bila Tserkva
Medalists at the Rhythmic Gymnastics World Championships
Universiade medalists in gymnastics
Universiade gold medalists for Ukraine
Universiade silver medalists for Ukraine
Universiade bronze medalists for Ukraine
Medalists at the 2013 Summer Universiade
Medalists at the 2015 Summer Universiade
Medalists at the 2009 Summer Universiade
Gymnasts from Kyiv